John Peter Spyros Sarbanes (born May 22, 1962) is an American lawyer and politician serving as the U.S. representative for  since 2007. He is a member of the Democratic Party. The district includes Annapolis, the entirety of Howard County, and parts of Anne Arundel and Carroll counties.

Early life
John Sarbanes is the eldest son of former U.S. Senator Paul Sarbanes (who served as a U.S. representative from 1971 to 1977 and a senator from 1977 to 2007) and Christine Dunbar Sarbanes, a teacher. He was born in Baltimore, having Greek origin on his father's side and English on his mother's, and graduated from the Gilman School there in 1980. He received a B.A., cum laude, from the Princeton School of Public and International Affairs at Princeton University in 1984, after completing a 194-page long senior thesis titled "The American Intelligence Community Abroad: Potential for a Breakdown Case Study, Greece, 1967". Sarbanes then received a J.D. from Harvard Law School, where he was co-chair of the Law School Democrats, in 1988.

After college, Sarbanes served for seven years with the Maryland State Department of Education, working on Maryland’s public school system. He later clerked with Baltimore Judge J. Frederick Motz on the U.S. District Court for the District of Maryland. Sarbanes spent his professional legal career at the law firm of Venable LLP in Baltimore from 1989 to 2006, where he was chair of health care practice from 2000 to 2006 and a member of the hiring committee from 1992 to 1996.

U.S. House of Representatives

Committee assignments
Committee on Energy and Commerce
Subcommittee on Energy
Subcommittee on Health
Subcommittee on Oversight and Investigations
Committee on Oversight and Reform
Subcommittee on Government Operations

Caucus memberships
Armenian Caucus
Congressional Public Service Caucus (Co-Chair)
House Congressional Hellenic Caucus
United States Congressional International Conservation Caucus
Joint Congressional Human Rights Caucus
Pakistan Caucus
Congressional Arts Caucus
Congressional NextGen 9-1-1 Caucus

Environmental education

Sarbanes has introduced H.R. 2054, the No Child Left Inside Act (NCLI), which seeks to both improve education in the nation's public schools and protect the environment by "creating a new environmental education grant program, providing teacher training for environmental education, and including environmental education as an authorized activity under the Fund for the Improvement of Education." NCLI also requires states that participate in the environmental education grant programs to develop a plan to ensure that high school graduates are environmentally literate. This legislation is supported by a "coalition of over 1200 local, regional, and national organizations representing millions of concerned citizens who are anxious to see a new commitment to environmental education."

Government reforms 

Following their victory in the 2018 midterm elections, House Democrats unveiled their first bill for the 116th Congress. This bill, the For the People Act, was primarily authored by Sarbanes. It passed the House in 2019, but died in the Republican-controlled Senate. The bill was introduced again in the 117th Congress and passed the House.

The bill was a package of Democratic electoral goals. It would enable small-dollar public funding of congressional elections, establish automatic national voter registration, expand early and online voter registration, and provide greater federal support for state voting systems. The bill bans members of Congress from serving on corporate boards, and requires political advocacy groups to disclose donors. It also requires presidents to disclose their tax returns, and the establishment of a Supreme Court ethics code. It includes a provision to decrease gerrymandering by creating independent commissions.

Campaigns

Sarbanes sought the Democratic nomination for Maryland's 3rd congressional district after 10-term incumbent Ben Cardin gave up the seat to run for the Senate seat of John Sarbanes's father, Paul Sarbanes. The primary campaign included State Senator Paula Hollinger, former Baltimore City Health Commissioner Peter Beilenson, and former Maryland Democratic Party Treasurer Oz Bengur. Sarbanes won the nomination on September 12, 2006, with 31.9% of the vote. His Republican opponent in the general election was Annapolis marketing executive John White. The 3rd is a heavily Democratic district that has been in that party's hands since 1927, and few expected Sarbanes to have much difficulty in the election. Sarbanes also benefited from name recognition; his father represented the district from 1971 to 1977. On November 7, 2006, Sarbanes won the general election with 64% of the vote to White's 34% and Libertarian Charles Curtis McPeek's 2%. He has been reelected seven times with no substantive opposition.

Personal life
Sarbanes lives in Towson, Maryland, with his three children and wife Dina Eve Caplan, whom he met at Harvard and married in 1988.

Sarbanes is a member of the Greek Orthodox Church.

References

External links 

 Congressman John Sarbanes official U.S. House website
 John Sarbanes for Congress
 

 

|-

1962 births
Living people
21st-century American politicians
American people of English descent
American people of Greek descent
Democratic Party members of the United States House of Representatives from Maryland
Eastern Orthodox Christians from Maryland
Eastern Orthodox Christians from the United States
Greek Orthodox Christians from the United States
Harvard Law School alumni
Lawyers from Baltimore
Politicians from Baltimore
Princeton School of Public and International Affairs alumni
Gilman School alumni